Pinehurst is an unincorporated village and census-designated place (CDP) in the town of Billerica, Middlesex County, Massachusetts, United States. The population was 7,152 at the 2010 census. It is located in the southeastern part of town along Massachusetts Route 3A between the Shawsheen River and the Burlington town line.

Pinehurst's zip code is 01866 and is for mail delivery to the Pinehurst PO Station only.  Home and office mail delivery in Pinehurst must use the Billerica, MA zip code (01821).

Geography
Pinehurst is located at  (42.533545, -71.229582).

Climate

In a typical year, Pinehurst, Massachusetts temperatures fall below 50F° for 195 days per year. Annual precipitation is typically 45.3 inches per year (high in the US) and snow covers the ground 62 days per year or 17% of the year (high in the US). It may be helpful to understand the yearly precipitation by imagining 9 straight days of moderate rain per year. The humidity is below 60% for approximately 25.4 days or 7% of the year.

Demographics

At the 2000 census there were 6,941 people, 2,245 households, and 1,874 families in the CDP. The racial makeup of the CDP was 94.93% White, 1.02% African American, 0.16% Native American, 2.39% Asian, 0.03% Pacific Islander, 0.19% from other races, and 1.28% from two or more races. Hispanic or Latino of any race were 1.30%.

Of the 2,245 households 39.7% had children under the age of 18 living with them, 70.6% were married couples living together, 8.9% had a female householder with no husband present, and 16.5% were non-families. 12.7% of households were one person and 4.4% were one person aged 65 or older. The average household size was 3.09 and the average family size was 3.39.

The age distribution was 27.1% under the age of 18, 6.8% from 18 to 24, 33.4% from 25 to 44, 24.8% from 45 to 64, and 8.0% 65 or older. The median age was 36 years. For every 100 females, there were 99.0 males. For every 100 females age 18 and over, there were 96.4 males.

The median household income was $73,713 and the median family income  was $76,369. Males had a median income of $49,811 versus $37,983 for females. The per capita income for the CDP was $25,334. About 3.9% of families and 3.8% of the population were below the poverty line, including 3.9% of those under age 18 and 3.8% of those age 65 or over.

References

 

Census-designated places in Middlesex County, Massachusetts
Villages in Middlesex County, Massachusetts
Billerica, Massachusetts
Villages in Massachusetts
Census-designated places in Massachusetts